The Malintji were an indigenous Australian people of the state of Queensland.

Country
They were the eastern neighbours of the Maiawali, living along Vergemont Creek, as far south as the vicinity of Jundah.

Social customs
The Malintji did not accept circumcision as part of their initiatory rites.

Alternative names
 Mullinchi, Mullinchie

Notes

Citations

Sources

Aboriginal peoples of Queensland